Wiesensee  is a small lake in the northwest corner of the Hochfilzen municipality of Tyrol, Austria.

Location
It gives its name to the Wiesenseetal (Wiesensee Valley).

Hydrology
Wiesensee is fed from the south and drained to the north by the Katzelbach stream. The lake is gradually silting up and the southern end has become a reed bed.

Amenities
Alongside Wiesensee are the Klettergarten Wiesensee (Rock Climbing Area), with 25 climbing routes, and the Kneipp water therapy trail.

References

Lakes of Tyrol (state)
Kitzbühel District